Per Ivar Gjærum (born 10 August 1948) a Norwegian organizational theorist, and Emeritus Associate Professor of Finance and Management Science at the Norwegian School of Economics (NHH). His specialty fields involve investment and project analysis.

Gjærum has also been visiting professor at London Business School. He served as rector of NHH from October 2001 to August 2005. His predecessor was Victor D. Norman and he was succeeded by Jan Haaland.

References

External links 
 Per Ivar Gjærum at nhh.no

1948 births
Living people
Norwegian economists
Norwegian business theorists
Academic staff of the Norwegian School of Economics
Rectors of the Norwegian School of Economics